Club Deportivo Guadalajara, S.A.D. is a Spanish football club based in Guadalajara, in the autonomous community of Castilla–La Mancha. Founded in 1947 it currently plays in Segunda División B – Group 2, holding home matches at Estadio Pedro Escartín, with a capacity for 8,000 seats.

History
Guadalajara was founded on 10 January 1947, playing its first match in the amateur league against Real Ávila CF, a 2–1 win. In 1970 its grounds, Pedro Escartín (in honour of a former referee), were inaugurated.

On 18 July 1985, on the day of the club hymn's official presentation, the club first appeared in the Copa del Rey, against Rayo Vallecano. It would spend the first sixty years of its existence in the fourth division and the regional leagues.

Guadalajara first reached the third level at the end of 2006–07, after a 3–2 aggregate win against UD Las Palmas Atlético in the playoffs. After four seasons in the category, the club climbed to division two: after finishing second in the regular season, promotion was achieved after a comeback against CD Mirandés in the playoffs (2–1 away success after a 0–1 home loss).

On 4 June 2013, shortly before the second division season was over, Guadalajara was dropped back to the third category after a two-year spell even though it eventually finished above the relegation zone, due to alleged financial irregularities.

Season to season

2 seasons in Segunda División
7 seasons in Segunda División B
50 seasons in Tercera División
1 season in Tercera División RFEF

Current squad

References

External links
 
Futbolme team profile 
BDFutbol team profile

 
Football clubs in Castilla–La Mancha
Association football clubs established in 1947
1947 establishments in Spain
Sport in Guadalajara, Spain
Segunda División clubs